Alvin  Dixon (born March 15, 1993) is a Liberian international defender who formerly played for Lao Toyota FC. He played for LISCR FC in 2011 before moving to Israelis side Hapoel Nazareth Illit and later 2014 moved to Asia where he is one of the best defenders in Lao top league for the two half (2\1)seasons. During the 2014 season, Dixon displayed quality with Lane Xang United FC as center back, the season created path for him to sign with Lao Toyota FC.

Club career
Dixon started his youth football with Telecom FC and later joined LPRC Oilers; he was one of the fastest defenders during his days at both clubs. In 2011 he got called to the Liberian national Under-20 national team, signed with LISCR FC in the Liberia top flight and went on to win the championship also appeared in the Confederation of African Football champions League (CAF champions League). In 2012 the center defender Alvin Dixon rejoined his former club LISCR FC in Liberia after playing half season for Hapoel Nazareth Illit in Israel due to serious injury. He was a solid leg for the club during the CAF Champion league fixture against Ghanaian club Berekum Chelsea in both home and away games.

Award
The Liberian defender won the Liberia league and moved to Laos in 2014, he won the championship with Laos Toyota FC in October 2015. Dixon picked up best defender award during his days in the Liberian league and now he is one of the best of Laos Toyota FC.

International
The Liberian defender played for the Liberia National Team U-20(Junior Lone
Star) 12 times and Senior National Team (Lone Star) 3 times making his debut in 2012.

References

External links
 
 

Association football defenders
1993 births
Living people
Liberian footballers
Sportspeople from Monrovia
Liberia international footballers